Sir John FitzSymond (c. 1342c. 1392), of North Shoebury, Essex, was an English politician.

He was the son and heir of Sir Edmund Fitzsymond of North Shoebury, Essex

FitzSymond was appointed High Sheriff of Essex and High Sheriff of Hertfordshire for 1378–1379 and was elected a member of parliament for Essex in April 1384, 1385 and September 1388.

References

 

1342 births
1392 deaths
People from Southend-on-Sea (district)
English MPs April 1384
English knights
High Sheriffs of Essex
High Sheriffs of Hertfordshire
English MPs 1385
English MPs September 1388